The Château de Trigonant is a château in Antonne-et-Trigonant, Dordogne, Nouvelle-Aquitaine, France.

Châteaux in Dordogne
Monuments historiques of Dordogne